Yangzhou or Yang Prefecture (洋州) was a zhou (prefecture) in imperial China, centering on modern Yang County, Shaanxi, China. It existed (intermittently) from the 6th century until 1370. During the short-lived Later Shu (934–965) it was known as Yuan Prefecture (源州).

Geography
The administrative region of Yang Prefecture in the Tang dynasty is under the administration of modern Hanzhong in southwestern Shaanxi. It probably includes parts of modern: 
Yang County
Xixiang County
Zhenba County
Foping County

Population
In the early 1100s during the Song dynasty, there were 45,490 households and 98,567 people.

See also
Yangchuan Commandery

References

 
 

Prefectures of the Yuan dynasty
Prefectures of the Tang dynasty
Prefectures of the Sui dynasty
Prefectures of Later Tang
Prefectures of Former Shu
Prefectures of the Song dynasty
Former prefectures in Shaanxi